The following is a list of all IFT-licensed over-the-air television stations broadcasting in the Mexican state of Chihuahua. There are 40 television stations in Chihuahua.

List of television stations

|-

|-

|-

|-

|-

|-

|-

|-

|-

|-

|-

|-

|-

|-

|-

|-

|-

-

|-

|-

|-

|-

|-

|-

|-

|-

|-

|-

|-

|-

|-

|-

|-

|-

|-

|-

|-

|-

|-

|-

|-

|-

|-

Defunct stations
 XHJMA-TV 3, Hidalgo del Parral (1969–2014)

See also
List of television stations in Texas and List of television stations in New Mexico for stations across the US border

References

Television stations in Chihuahua
Chihu